Neodrillia blakensis is a species of sea snail, a marine gastropod mollusk in the family Drilliidae.

Description
The length of the shell varies between 40 mm and 45 mm.

Distribution
This species occurs in the western Atlantic Ocean off the Bahamas; also off Martinique.

References

External links

 Fallon P.J. (2016). Taxonomic review of tropical western Atlantic shallow water Drilliidae (Mollusca: Gastropoda: Conoidea) including descriptions of 100 new species. Zootaxa. 4090(1): 1–363
 

blakensis
Gastropods described in 2007